The 1996 season was the Baltimore Ravens' inaugural season in the National Football League and first under coach Ted Marchibroda. They played their home games at Memorial Stadium in Baltimore, Maryland.

Baltimore had remained without an NFL football franchise for 12 years after the Baltimore Colts relocated to Indianapolis, Indiana. In 1996, however, the NFL approved Cleveland Browns owner Art Modell's proposal to relocate the existing Browns organization to Baltimore, although the records and name of the Browns would remain in Cleveland, Ohio and the Baltimore franchise would officially be an expansion franchise. After Modell established the franchise in Baltimore, the team was named the "Baltimore Ravens" via a poll conducted by The Baltimore Sun as the team was assigned to play in the American Football Conference (AFC) Central Division; afterwards, over 50,000 tickets were sold for the entire season.

The Ravens would finish their first season with a 4–12 record under coach Ted Marchibroda, who coached the Colts before and after they relocated and has a 41–33 regular season record in Baltimore. At the Ravens’ first-ever regular season game, a then-record attendance of 64,124 was present in their win against the Oakland Raiders, 19–14, on September 1 at home. Their second victory came in Week 5, against the New Orleans Saints at home, in which they became 2–2. In Week 7, the Ravens traveled to Indianapolis to play Baltimore's previous team, the Colts. They, however, lost 26–21 and fell to 2–4. Their only other two victories were recorded at home in Week 9 against the St. Louis Rams and Week 14 against the Steelers.

Although not a winning season, quarterback Vinny Testaverde and safety Eric Turner were voted into the Pro Bowl, and wide receivers Michael Jackson and Derrick Alexander became the fourth receiving duo to surpass the 1,000-yard receiving mark. The Ravens held second-half leads in ten of their final eleven games; they ultimately went 3–7 in games decided by one possession.

As of the 2021 off-season, Michael Jackson's 1,201 receiving yards and 14 touchdown receptions stands as franchise single-season records.

Offseason 
Prior to the season, the Ravens hired several coaches, including head coach Ted Marchibroda and defensive coordinator Marvin Lewis. Offensive guard Jeff Blackshear was acquired for a future 4th round draft pick. The Ravens traded 3rd, 4th, and 7th round draft picks for the Broncos’ second round selection (#55 overall).

NFL draft

Personnel

Staff

Roster

Preseason

Schedule

Regular season

Schedule 

Note: Intra-division opponents are in bold text.

Standings

References

External links 
 1996 Baltimore Ravens at Pro-Football-Reference.com

Baltimore Ravens
Baltimore Ravens seasons
Baltimore Ravens
1990s in Baltimore